Apart is a 2011 American drama film directed by Aaron Rottinghaus.

Noah Greene and Emily Gates share the same psychological affliction: induced delusional disorder, or folie à deux. They must uncover the mystery of a tragic past in order to find hope in the future. The director, Aaron Rottinghaus, noted in an interview at SXSW 2011 that the film is based on actual case studies of induced delusional disorder.

Cast
 Olesya Rulin as Emily Gates
 Josh Danziger as Noah Greene
 Bruce McGill as Dr. Thomas Abner
 Joey Lauren Adams as Dr. Jan Sheppard
 Michael Bowen as Teddy Berg
 Sue Rock as Julie Gates
 David Born as Joseph Greene
 Jason Davis (actor) as Oliver Greene
 Shiree Nelson as Kelly Corrigan

References

External links
 
 
 

2011 films
2010s mystery drama films
2011 romantic drama films
American romantic drama films
American mystery drama films
2010s English-language films
2010s American films